Lianshan is a town in Fuchuan Yao Autonomous County, Guangxi, China.

Administrative division
As of 2016, the town is divided into one community and eleven villages: 

 Lianshanjie Community
 Jishan
 Shazhou
 Jinfeng
 Luoshan
 Liantang
 Dongkou
 Xiabashan
 Yangshi
 Mixi
 Ludong
 Jingzhou

Geography
The town is situated at southeastern Fuchuan Yao Autonomous County. It is surrounded by Gucheng Town on the north, Guigu Reservoir on the west, Jianghua Yao Autonomous County and Xinhua Township on the east, and Baisha Town on the south.

The Shijia Stream flow through the town northeast to southwest.

Economy
The town's economy is based on nearby mineral resources and agricultural resources. Agricultural crops include grains, fruits, and vegetables. Navel orange and pear are the economic plants of this region. The region abounds with iron and rare-earth mineral.

Tourist attractions
Guishi National Wetland Park is a famous scenic spot.

Transportation
The China National Highway G538 passes through the town.

References

Bibliography

Towns of Hezhou